Pyeongtaek Citizen FC is a South Korean football club based in the city of Pyeongtaek. The club is a member of the K4 League, the fourth tier of league football in South Korea.

Current squad

Season-by-season records

See also
 List of football clubs in South Korea

References

External links
 Pyeongtaek Citizen FC official website 

K3 League clubs
K3 League (2007–2019) clubs
Sport in Gyeonggi Province
Pyeongtaek
Association football clubs established in 2017
2017 establishments in South Korea